Bajo el signo de la patria is a 1971 Argentine drama film directed by René Múgica and written by Isaac Aisemberg. The film premiered in Argentina on 20 May 1971.

Cast
Ignacio Quirós as General Manuel Belgrano
Enrique Liporace
Héctor Pellegrini
Roberto Airaldi
Leonor Benedetto
Mario Passano
Reynaldo Mompel
Martín Adjemián
Aldo Mayo
Gloria Leyland
Mario Lozano
Juan Carlos Lamas
Hugo Mújica
Aldo Barbero
Jesús Pampín
Néstor Zembrini

External links

1971 films
1970s Spanish-language films
1970s war drama films
Films directed by René Múgica
Works about the Argentine War of Independence
Manuel Belgrano
Argentine war drama films
1971 drama films
1970s Argentine films